Fabrice Guérit (born July 2, 1970 in Niort, France) is a former professional footballer who played as a central defender. He played one Division 2 match in the 1992-93 season.

External links
Fabrice Guérit profile at chamoisfc79.fr

1970 births
Living people
French footballers
Association football defenders
Chamois Niortais F.C. players
Ligue 2 players